The Magnolia Grange is a historic mansion located across from the Chesterfield County Courthouse in Chesterfield, Chesterfield County, Virginia. This brick plantation house was built in 1823,  and is a two-story, five bay, brick dwelling in the Federal style. It is known for its elaborate woodwork and ornamental ceiling medallions.

The house was restored in the 1970s with Zuber scenic wallpaper of a hunting landscape that was installed in the front hallway. Magnolia Grange was listed on the National Register of Historic Places in 1980.

The plantation house is operated as a historic house museum by the Chesterfield Historical Society.

References

External links

 Magnolia Grange - Chesterfield Historical Society

Houses on the National Register of Historic Places in Virginia
Federal architecture in Virginia
Houses completed in 1823
Houses in Chesterfield County, Virginia
Museums in Chesterfield County, Virginia
Historic house museums in Virginia
National Register of Historic Places in Chesterfield County, Virginia